Bad Oeynhausen is a spa town on the southern edge of the Wiehengebirge in the district of Minden-Lübbecke in the East-Westphalia-Lippe region of North Rhine-Westphalia, Germany. The closest larger towns are Bielefeld (39 kilometres southwest) and Hanover (80 km east).

History 
In the village of Bergkirchen, which belongs to Bad Oeynhausen, a wellspring sanctuary existed in pre-Christian (Saxon) times at the local crossing of the Wiehengebirge, which was replaced in the 9th century by a church. Today's church is a subsequent building. On the church and the downhill-situated Widukind spring plates explain this further. A few metres from the church a 13th-century timbered homestead can still be found.

In 753 Pepin the Short, according to the Royal Frankish Annals, stopped over ad locum qui dicitur Rimiae, so that Rehme is commonly accepted as the oldest part of town.

The origin myth of Bad Oeynhausen relates that in 1745 a local farmer named Sültemeyer noticed that after his pigs had wallowed in nearby mud they had a salty crust on their backs and he decided to investigate the source. After public awareness of this finding, King Frederick II of Prussia ordered the construction of a saltworks, which was named "Royal Saline Neusalzwerk". Today's Sültemeyer Fountain (colloquial: Pig-Fountain), in the city centre, is a reminder of the city's beginning.

After 1830, mining captain Carl Baron of Oeynhausen (1795–1865) oversaw drilling in today's spa garden area in search of salt deposits, but instead found a thermal salt spring in 1845. Quickly the healing abilities of this spring were discovered and first baths were built in the community, which now was called "Neusalzwerk near Rehme". In 1848 King Frederick William IV of Prussia renamed it to "Royal Bath (German: Bad) Oeynhausen", and this name was retained after receiving its own town charter in 1860. 
The opening of the Cologne-Minden railway line in 1847 connected the city with railroad network.

The growth of spa activities and the town's development continued into World War II. Among other things the Kurpark (spa garden), according to plans by Peter Joseph Lenné, and the Kurhaus (spa hotel) in 1908 (from 1980 to 2002 a Casino was located here; today called the Kaiserpalais, it hosts a Varieté, a noble restaurant and a discothèque) were constructed. At the beginning of the 20th century residential houses for the bourgeoisie were built around the spa garden. The extraordinary conglomeration of different architectural styles of the spa garden's buildings and the surrounding mansions bestowed Bad Oeynhausen the unofficial title "Museum for the Architecture of the 19th Century". 
One of the most famous buildings, the "Farne-Villa" was replaced by a new building in 1969.

In the first half of the 20th century additional thermal salt springs were drilled. Among these the Jordansprudel, drilled in 1926, is best known and with a capacity of 6000 L/min and a total height of up to 40 m it is the world's highest carbonated thermal salt spring and de facto the town's landmark.

Under Nazi Germany, Bad Oeynhausen hosted a synod of the Confessing Church, as well as the home congregation to Jakob Emil Karl Koch, a leading member. The World War II tank factory of the town was bombed on 30 March 1945. Post-war, the town hosted the Control Commission for Germany – British Element (CCG/BE), the military government for the British Zone of Occupation and served as the British Army of the Rhine headquarters.

The town was returned to local control in 1954 and spa activities resumed. In 1973, the seven surrounding municipalities Wulferdingsen, Volmerdingsen, Werste, Eidinghaisen, Dehme, Rehme and Lohe of the former "Amt Rehme" were merged with Bad Oeynhausen into one commune. The "State-owned Spa Bad Oeynhausen", property of the state of North Rhine-Westphalia, was municipalised in 2004.

Geography 
Bad Oeynhausen is located on the left bank of the Weser river. It has the world's most highly carbonated thermal saltwater fountain, the Jordansprudel. On calm days the fountain gets up to 40 metres high. The water of the spring is believed to have many medicinal qualities, giving rise to a number of health spas.

Land use 
A large percentage of the area is used for agriculture:

This applies to the entire district of Minden-Lübbecke, where the majority of the land is used for agriculture.

Districts 
Bad Oeynhausen consists of 8 districts:

Climate 
The climate in Bad Oeynhausen is controlled by the Oceanic Climate. The values are based on the ones from Herford (Temperature) and the ones in Bad Oeynhausen (Precipitation)

Notable buildings 
Bad Oeynhausen built a mall called the "Werre-Park". It gets its name from the nearby river Werre and was opened on 1 April 1998.

Demographics 

¹ census result

Health treatment facilities 
There are a number of health treatment facilities in Bad Oeynhausen. The Maternus Rehabilitation Clinic deals with rehabilitation for orthopedic, degenerative, and neurological conditions. The Klinik am Korso deals with eating disorders. The Median Rehabilitation Clinic specializes on rehabilitation for Muslim patients. The Heart and Diabetes Center North Rhine-Westphalia, an institution of the Ruhr University Hospitals, is a world-leading institution for the treatment of cardiac, circulatory and metabolic diseases. 
Just outside the city lies the Klinik Bad Oexen, a rehabilitation center for cancer patients.

Twin towns – sister cities

Bad Oeynhausen is twinned with:
 Fismes, France
 Inowrocław, Poland

Notable people
 August von Borries (1852–1906), railway engineer
 Wilhelm Schlüter, politician (1871–1930), (SPD)
 Fritz Tarnow (1880–1951), trade unionist and politician (SPD)
 Friedrich Altemeier (1886–1968), fighter pilot in WWI
 Walther Ludwig (1902–1981), opera singer (tenor)
 F. Wolfgang Schnell (1913–2006), agronomist
 Siegfried Linkwitz (born 1935), engineer
 Christian Berg (born 1966), author and composer
 Torben Giehler (born 1973), painter
 Arne Friedrich (born 1979), former footballer of German national team

Associated with the town 
 Peter Joseph Lenné (1789–1866), landscape architect, designed the park
 Eduard Hoffmann (1832–1894), entrepreneur
 Friedrich Christoph Pelizaeus (1851–1942), neurologist
 Karl Koch (1876–1951), Superintendent, President of the Evangelical Church of Westphalia
 Kurt Thomas (1904–1973), composer and choirmaster
 Reinhart Koselleck (1923–2006), historian
 Frank Gehry (born 1929), architect, designed two buildings for Bad Oeynhausen
 Jochen Fahrenberg (born 1937), personality psychologist and psychophysiologist
 Ingo Petzke (born 1947), filmmaker and author
 Roland Pröll (born 1949), pianist, conductor, composer
 René Müller (born 1959), footballer

References

External links 

  
 

Towns in North Rhine-Westphalia
Spa towns in Germany
Minden-Lübbecke